USS Merganser may refer to the following ships of the United States Navy:

 , was originally the commercial trawler Annapolis acquired by the US Navy 3 January 1942 and decommissioned 1 May 1944
 USS Merganser (AM-405), would have been a minesweeper but the contract for her construction was canceled 12 August 1945
 , was launched as YMS-417 29 June 1944, redesignated AMS‑26 and named Merganser 17 February 1947 and decommissioned 2 April 1958.

See also

 , which served as the fishery patrol vessel Merganser in the United States Bureau of Fisheries from 1919 to 1940 and the Fish and Wildlife Service from 1940 to 1942.

United States Navy ship names